Jongmyo may refer to:

 Jongmyo (shrine), a kind of shrine in the East Asian cultural sphere
 Jongmyo (Seoul), a shrine of that type in Seoul, Korea